Barylambda (Greek: "heavy" (baros), "lambda" (lambda) in a reference to larger size than that of Pantolambda) is an extinct genus of pantodont mammal from the middle to late Paleocene, well known from several finds in the Wasatchian (NALMA classification) DeBeque Formation of Colorado and the Clarkforkian Wasatch Formation to Tiffanian Fort Union Formation in Wyoming. Three species of Barylambda are currently recognized. The creature likely lived a life similar to that of a modern tapir, browsing on foliage and soft vegetation. Barylambda seems to have been quite successful for an early pantodont, though eventually it seems to have been replaced in its ecosystem by other pantodonts, such as Coryphodon.

Description 

In life, Barylambda probably resembled a large ground sloth, with a small head and long, well-developed tail and bear-like legs. Barylambda was large even for a pantodont, sheer size probably protecting it from contemporary carnivores.

Like other pantodonts, Barylambda was a heavyset, five-toed plantigrade animal. The vertebrae of the tail were unusually massive; the living animal may have been able to rear up and support itself on the hind legs and tail in order to reach higher for food. The generalized appearance of the teeth, the presence of well-developed canines only in males, the grinding wear and lack of shearing blades on the molars, and the animal's heavy build strongly suggest that it was herbivorous.

References

External links 
 Ferae Past and Present (Phylogenetic tree) at Okapiland

Pantodonts
Paleogene mammals of North America
Paleocene mammals
Clarkforkian
Tiffanian
Wasatchian
Fossils of the United States
Paleontology in Colorado
Paleontology in Wyoming
Fossil taxa described in 1937
Prehistoric mammal genera